The Infantry Regiment "Asturias" No. 31 (Spanish: Regimiento de Infantería "Asturias" nº 31) is a mechanized infantry unit in the Spanish Army. It was created in the Kingdom of Asturias on 6 July 1703. Its first commander was Álvaro Navia Osorio y Vigil, Viscount of Puerto de Vega and Marquis de Santa Cruz de Marcenado. The regiment initially consisted of 600 men. It was also known as El Cangrejo ("The Crab"), a name which it obtained following the campaign in Roussillon from 1793 to 1795, during which it never retreated. The patron saint of the regiment is Our Lady of Covadonga.

Military history of Spain
Infantry regiments of Spain
Military units and formations established in 1703
History of Asturias
Mechanized units and formations
1703 establishments in Spain